The following is a list of notable deaths in November 1997.

Entries for each day are listed alphabetically by surname. A typical entry lists information in the following sequence:
 Name, age, country of citizenship at birth, subsequent country of citizenship (if applicable), reason for notability, cause of death (if known), and reference.

November 1997

1
Wolfgang Abel, 92, Austrian anthropologist and Nazi racial biologist.
Jon-Henri Damski, 60, American essayist, columnist, poet, and gay rights activist, cancer.
Serge Hutin, 70, French author of books on  esoterica and the occult.
Gérard Légaré, 89, Canadian politician.
Roger Marche, 73, French football player.
Bruno Michaud, 62, Swiss footballer and manager.
Victor Mills, 100, American chemical engineer for the Procter & Gamble company.
Cullen Rogers, 76, American gridiron football player.

2
Ken Cooper, 74, American football player and coach.
Edmond Adolphe de Rothschild, 71, French-Swiss banker, emphysema.
Ayya Khema, 74, German-American Buddhist teacher, breast cancer.
Roy McMillan, 68, American baseball player, coach and manager.
Helen Stevenson Meyner, 68, American politician.
Maulana Habibullah Mukhtar, 53, Pakistani Islamic scholar and writer.
Shōshin Nagamine, 90, Japanese karate Master, mayor and author.
Gerhard Neumann, 80, German-American aviation engineer, leukemia.
Tony Novis, 91, English rugby football player.
Harold Plenderleith, 99, Scottish art conservator and archaeologist.
Bernhard Plettner, 82, German engineer and manager.
Carson Smith, 66, American jazz double-bassist.
G. Harry Stine, 69, American writer and science fiction author, stroke.

3
Wally Bruner, 66, American journalist and television host, liver cancer.
Attilio Conton, 95, Italian long-distance runner and Olympian.
Antoine Cuissard, 73, French football player and manager.
Vladimir Guliayev, 73, Soviet actor of theater and cinema.
Ashot Navasardyan, 47, Armenian politician and military commander, heart attack.
Satyapramoda Tirtha, Indian guru and philosopher.

4
Noboru Aota, 72, Japanese baseball player, lung cancer.
George Chambers, 69, Prime Minister of Trinidad and Tobago.
René-Jean Clot, 84, French painter and novelist.
Wilfred Coutts, 89, Australian politician.
Johnny Dickshot, 87, American baseball player.
Ranesh Das Gupta, 85, Bangladeshi writer, journalist and politician.
Richard Hooker, 73, American surgeon and writer, leukemia.

5
James Robert Baker, 50, American novelist and screenwriter, suicide.
Yemane Baria, 48, Eritrean singer-songwriter.
Isaiah Berlin, 88, British social and political theorist, philosopher and historian.
Louise Campbell, 86, American actress.
Camilla Cederna, 86, Italian writer and editor, cancer.
Peter Jackson, 33, Australian rugby league footballer, drug overdose.
George Philip Bradley Roberts, 91, British Army officer.
William C. Watson, 59, American actor.

6
Luigi Cantone, 80, Italian fencer and Olympic champion.
Norbert Carbonnaux, 79, French film director and screenwriter.
Ray Daniel, 69, Welsh football player and manager.
Jahangir Forouhar, 81, Iranian actor.
Leon Forrest, 60, American novelist.
Annie Llewelyn-Davies, Baroness Llewelyn-Davies of Hastoe, 82, British politician and peer, cerebrovascular disease, bronchopneumonia.
Anne Stine Ingstad, 79, Norwegian archaeologist.
Lillian Rogers Parks, 100, American housemaid and seamstress in the White House.
Josef Pieper, 93, German Catholic philosopher.
Epic Soundtracks, 38, British musician, drug overdose.
Jane Thurgood-Dove, 34, Australian murder victim, shot.

7
Lloyd Hamilton Donnell, 102, American mechanical engineer.
Clyde Gilmour, 85, Canadian broadcaster and journalist
Margaret Harshaw, 88, American opera singer and voice teacher.
Rafael Hernández, 69, Spanish film actor.
Mitchell P. Kobelinski, 69, American banker and attorney.
Paul Ricard, 88, French industrialist and creator of Pernod Ricard.

8
Henry Bland, 87, Australian public servant.
Lam Ching-ying, 44, Hong Kong stuntman and actor, liver cancer.
Prosper Depredomme, 79, Belgian racing cyclist.
Mohammad-Ali Jamalzadeh, 102, Iranian author.
Robert John Kerr, Northern Irish loyalist, vapour explosion.
Fedir Medvid, 54, Ukrainian and Soviet football player.
Michael Ward, 88, English actor.

9
Paul Haghedooren, 38, Belgian cyclist, heart attack.
Carl Gustav Hempel, 92, German writer and philosopher, pneumonia.
Helenio Herrera, 87, French-Argentine football player and manager.
Leonard Matthews, 83, British publisher and editor.
Joe Roccisano, 58, American jazz saxophonist and arranger.
Moody Sarno, 83, American football player and coach.
Cecil Smith, 89, Canadian figure skater.
Wu Xiuquan, 89, Chinese communist revolutionary, military officer, and diplomat.

10
Lloyd Cardwell, 84, American football player and coach.
Leon W. Johnson, 93, United States Air Force general, respiratory infection.
Ave Ninchi, 82, Italian actress.
Tommy Tedesco, 67, American guitarist and studio musician, lung cancer.
Annie Dodge Wauneka, 87, American Navajo Nation activist.

11
William Alland, 81, American film producer (Creature from the Black Lagoon, It Came from Outer Space) and actor (Citizen Kane), complications from heart disease.
Max Bangerter, 86, Swiss gymnast and Olympian.
Shake Keane, 70, Vincentian jazz musician and poet, stomach cancer.
Lucien Xavier Michel-Andrianarahinjaka, 67, Malagasy writer, poet and politician.
Rod Milburn, 47, American athlete, work-related accident.
Gintaras Ramonas, 35, Lithuanian politician.
Menahem Max Schiffer, 86, German-American mathematician.

12
Luke Brown, 62, American professional wrestler known as Luke "Big Boy" Brown, stroke.
Alberto Cavallone, 59, Italian film director and screenwriter.
Tom Chang, 31, Taiwanese singer, songwriter, and music producer.
James Laughlin, 83, American poet and literary book publisher, complications following a stroke.
William Matthews, 55, American poet and essayist.
Rainer Ptacek, 46, American guitarist and singer-songwriter, brain tumor.
Carola Standertskjöld, 56, Finnish jazz and pop singer, Alzheimer's disease.
Carlos Surinach, 82, Spanish-American composer.
Sándor Szabó, 82, Hungarian actor.
Maria von Maltzan, 88, German noblewoman and resistance member during World War II.
Howard Weiss, 80, American gridiron football player.

13
André Boucourechliev, 72, Bulgarian-French composer.
Alexandru Bârlădeanu, 86, Romanian Marxian economist.
Bill Conroy, 82, American baseball player.
James Couttet, 76, French alpine skier and ski jumper and Olympian.
Dietrich Lohmann, 54, German cinematographer, leukemia.
Onzy Matthews, 67, American jazz musician and actor, heart failure.
P. Ravindran, 74, Indian politician.
Larry Shinoda, 67, American automotive designer, kidney failure.
Moe Thacker, 63, American baseball player.

14
Knud Andersen, 75, Danish cyclist and Olympian.
Eddie Arcaro, 81, American jockey, liver cancer.
Alba de Céspedes, 86, Cuban-Italian writer.
Joel Lee Brenner, 85, American mathematician.
Stefan Lorant, 96, Hungarian-American filmmaker, photojournalist, and author.
Jack Pickersgill, 92, Canadian civil servant and politician.
Kiyoshi Saitō, 90, Japanese printmaker.
N. V. N. Somu, 60, Indian politician, helicopter crash.

15
Aaron Brown, 53, American football player, traffic accident.
Saul Chaplin, 85, American composer and musical director, complication from a fall.
Alf Day, 90, Welsh professional footballer.
Coen van Vrijberghe de Coningh, 47, Dutch actor, musician, composer, and television presenter, heart attack.
Warren Douglas, 86, American actor and screenwriter, heart failure.
Jim Kepner, 74, American journalist, author, archivist and gay rights activist.
Elizza La Porta, 95, Romanian-American film actress.
Douglas MacArthur II, 88, American diplomat.
Vladimir Vengerov, 77, Soviet and Russian film director.
Nándor Wagner, 75, Hungarian artist and sculptor.

16
Albert L. Ireland, 79, United States Marine Corps sergeant and recipient of nine purple hearts.
José Behra, 73, French racing driver and rally driver.
Captain Mikey, 62, American disc jockey and voice-over actor, leukemia.
Brigitte Groh, 31, German figure skater.
Georges Marchais, 77, French politician, heart attack.
Russ Meyer, 74, American baseball player.
Padmapriya, Indian actress.
George O. Petrie, 85, American radio and television actor, lymphoma.
Aaron John Sharp, 93, American botanist and bryologist.
Roy Sheffield, 90, English cricket player.
Robert N. Thompson, 83, Canadian politician and chiropractor.

17
Richard Sumner Cowan, 76, American botanist, brain trauma.
Gert Günther Hoffmann, 68, German actor and director.
David Ignatow, 83, American poet.
Wilfred Josephs, 70, English composer.
Edwin Mansfield, 67, American academic, cancer.
Orlando Ribeiro, 86, Portuguese geographer and historian.
John Wimber, 63, American Christian leader, mystic and musician, brain hemorrhage.
Milič Čapek, 88, Czech–American philosopher.

18
John Bird, 71, British politician.
Jean Conan Doyle, 84, British Royal Air Force officer , Parkinson's disease.
Unichi Hiratsuka, 102, Japanese printmaker.
Fredrik Horn, 81, Norwegian football player.
Stanislav Rapotec, 86, Slovene-Australian artist.
Robert Vandeputte, 89, Belgian economist, civil servant, and politician.
Joyce Wethered, 96, British golfer.

19
Mary Bernheim, 95, British biochemist.
Charles de Graft Dickson, 84, Ghanaian educationist and a politician.
Gwendolyn Wilson Fowler, 89, American pharmacist.
Yosef Rom, 65, Israeli engineer and politician.
Alfred Roome, 88, English film editor.
Kjell Schou-Andreassen, 57, Norwegian footballer and manager, leukemia.

20
Asbjørn Aavik, 94, Norwegian lutheran missionary and writer.
Larry Ferrari, 65, American organist, leukemia.
Dick Littlefield, 71, American baseball player.
Robert Palmer, 52, American writer, musician and blues producer, liver disease.

21
Bill Boyd, 91, American poker player.
Ismail Fahmi, 75, Egyptian diplomat and politician.
Harold Geneen, 87, American businessman.
Julian Jaynes, 77, American psychologist.
Grayson L. Kirk, 94, American political scientist.
Jack Purvis, 60, English actor (Star Wars, Time Bandits, Brazil).
Robert Simpson, 76, English composer.

22
Roger Brown, 55, American artist and painter.
Michael Hutchence, 37, Australian musician (INXS), suicide by hanging.
Joanna Moore, 63, American film and television actress, lung cancer.
Kalki Sadasivam, 95, Indian freedom fighter, singer, journalist and film producer.

23
Hulda Crooks, 101, American mountaineer.
Henry Wilson, Baron Wilson of Langside, 81, Scottish lawyer and politician.
Robert Lewis, 88, American actor, director and author, heart failure.
Irene E. Ryan, 88, American geologist, aviator and legislator.
Ivan Ðurić, 50, Serbian writer, professor, historian and politician, suicide.

24
Barbara, French singer, respiratory problems.
Jorge Mas Canosa, 58, Cuban-American immigrant and anti-Castro lobbyist, lung cancer.
Maurits Gysseling, 78, Belgian linguist.
Bill Lawrie, 63, Australian racing cyclist.
John Sopinka, 64, Ukrainian-Canadian lawyer and judge.
Ira Wolfert, 89, American Pulitzer Prize-winning war correspondent and writer.

25
Hastings Banda, 99, President of Malawi (1966–1994).
Cathee Dahmen, 52, American model, chronic obstructive pulmonary disease.
James H. Ellis, 73, British engineer and cryptographer.
Eustace Fannin, 82, South African tennis player.
Charles Hallahan, 54, American actor (The Thing, Hunter, Dante's Peak), heart attack.
Viorel Mateianu, 59, Romanian football player and coach.
Stephen L.R. McNichols, 83, American politician, heart failure.
Elmore Morgenthaler, 75, American basketball player, pneumonia.
M. Prabhakar Reddy, Indian film actor.
Fenton Robinson, 62, American blues singer, brain cancer.
Jon Silkin, 66, British poet.

26
Rudolf Buhse, 92, German Wehrmacht officer and Bundeswehr general.
Erna Fentsch, 88, German actress and screenwriter.
Marguerite Henry, 95, American children's author.
Werner Höfer, 84, German journalist.

27
David D Barron, 33, Mexican gang member, friendly fire.
Jules Henriet, 79, Belgian football player.
Eduardo Kingman, 84, Ecuadorian artist.
Malcolm Knowles, 84, American adult educator, stroke.
Eric Laithwaite, 76, British electrical engineer.
Buck Leonard, 90, American baseball player.
Ronald Martland, 90, Canadian lawyer and judge.
Gull-Maj Norin, 84, Danish actress.
Yves Prévost, 89, Canadian politician.
Branko Ružić, 78, Croatian painter and sculptor.
Merike Talve, 40, Canadian curator, artist and writer, breast cancer.

28
Qemal Butka, Albanian architect, painter and politician.
Wallace H. Clark, Jr., American dermatologist and pathologist, ruptured aneurysm.
Tom Evenson, 87, English long-distance runner and Olympian.
Georges Marchal, 77, French actor.
Ken Mitsuda, 95, Japanese film actor, stroke.
William "Smitty" Smith, 53, Canadian keyboardist and session musician.

29
Ernest Johnson, 85, British track cyclist and Olympian.
Isabelle M. Kelley, 80, American social worker.
Abdul Latif, 46, Indian criminal, shot.
Ada Leonard, 82, American bandleader.
Heikki Savolainen, 90, Finnish artistic gymnast.
George Sodeinde Sowemimo, 77, Nigerian jurist and Chief Justice.
Coleman Young, 79, American politician, emphysema.

30
Kathy Acker, 50, American experimental novelist, playwright and essayist, cancer.
Glyn Dearman, 57, English actor, domestic accident.
Mary Fergusson, 83, British civil engineer.
Kay Green, 70, Welsh cricket player.
Karl Kowanz, 71, Austrian football player and coach.
Sami Al Lenqawi, 25, Kuwaiti football player.
Alfred Næss, 70, Norwegian playwright and songwriter.
Leo Edward O'Neil, 69, American prelate of the Roman Catholic Church, multiple myeloma.
Françoise Prévost, 67, French actress, journalist and author, breast cancer.
Shamo Quaye, 26, Ghanaian Football player.
Božena Srncová, 72, Czech gymnast and Olympian.
Bernardo Élis, 82, Brazilian lawyer, professor, poet, and writer.

References 

1997-11
 11